A Voice in the Dark (originally titled Dark Zoey) is an ongoing comic book series that is written, drawn, toned, and lettered by Larime Taylor. It was first launched in November 2013 by Taylor, who funded the series via a successful Kickstarter campaign. Taylor, who was born with arthrogryposis and identifies as non-binary, draws the series by using their mouth, a brush, and a WACOM Cintiq tablet. Their wife Sylv, who is legally blind, serves as the colorist for the individual issues and volume covers.

Synopsis
The series follows Zoey, a seemingly normal young woman that has the desire to kill the people around her and to become a serial killer. Her first and so far only victim was Annabelle Turner, a teenage schoolgirl that was having a secret sexual relationship with Zoey's best friend Seven. Annabelle seduced Seven into thinking that she really cared about her before outing Seven to the school and her parents, who disowned her. Seven attempted to commit suicide but was unsuccessful. She then moved in with Zoey's family, who ended up legally adopting her. Zoey stalked and murdered Annabelle, telling the teen that she was killing Annabelle because of her treatment towards Seven. Annabelle apologized for her actions before dying, which prompted conflicted emotions in Zoey. As she does not want to commit more murders, Zoey has vowed to avoid killing anyone- a feat made more difficult because she genuinely enjoys the process. Zoey records all of this via journals that she burns as soon as she fills them up completely.

Things become more difficult after Zoey begins attending Blair College in California, where she has to deal with her fellow college students, roommates, and the college town's history of murder. She takes on the responsibilities of becoming a disc jockey and talk show host for Blair's college radio station, something that she was initially hesitant about. On her first show Zoey takes random calls, one of which is from a girl named "Heather", who confesses that she is thinking about committing suicide due to actions she committed that led to the attempted suicide of her classmate Trinna, an outcast. Heather had persuaded Trinna into attending a drinking party in a hotel room, where Trinna was pressured into drinking until she passed out, at which point Heather and her friends took pictures of Trinna's naked body and sent them to various people in the school. The confession disgusts Zoey, as it reminds her of how Seven was treated and because Heather tries to justify her actions by saying that Trinna didn't really have to drink the beers they offered her. While she is talking with Heather, Zoey gets her uncle and crime scene investigator Zeke to trace the call and try to prevent the suicide. During her conversation with Heather Zoey realizes that Heather learned her behavior from the people around her, which prompts Heather to admit that she had been raped by a client her father was trying to sign to a record deal. The confession gives Zeke the information they need to find Heather's true identity, but results in Heather shooting her parents dead. The deaths shake Zoey to her core, as her inner killer (who she is occasionally seen conversing with in a mirror) later taunts her with the knowledge that she enjoyed overhearing the deaths. During all of this an unnamed serial killer is murdering beautiful, wealthy young women and leaving behind Polaroids with their dead bodies.

As a result of the deaths Zoey must keep her radio identity secret and she manages to convince her roommates to keep her secret. During all of this Zoey tries to stick to her vow of not killing anyone, a vow that she eventually ends up breaking after she attends a sorority party with her roommate Ash, as their fellow roommate Krista begged them to go. While there, Zoey is nearly raped by Brock, the boyfriend of Mandy, a snobby sorority girl. This near-rape, along with the knowledge that Mandy's actions with Krista resulted in Krista being orally raped by a male classmate, pushes Zoey into committing murder yet again. As Zoey has experience in crime scene investigation due to her relationship with her uncle Zeke, she manages to murder Mandy and Brock without any problems. However her actions were not completely unseen, as she soon discovers that the town's active serial killer saw her actions and has expressed his or her admiration in the form of a message to Zoey by way of a Polaroid of the deceased Mandy.

Characters
Zoey: Zoey is a young, biracial college student that has to fight her urge to murder people. In issue 1 she begins attending Blair College, where she works with the college's radio station. She has a fairly good knowledge of crime scene investigation due to her relationship with her uncle Zeke. Zoey is unsure as to why she has the urge to kill people and has openly stated in the series that she has had a good upbringing, which she says is contrary to the popular assumption that murderers have led difficult lives. As of issue 6, the only living person aware of Zoey's true nature is the unnamed serial killer.
Zeke: Zeke is Zoey's uncle and a crime scene investigator in California. He is shown to be openly gay and is investigating a series of murders committed by an as of yet unnamed serial killer. He has a close relationship with Zoey and is willing to talk about the recent deaths with his niece, as the two have a close relationship and Zoey has shown an interest in his job. 
Ash: Ash is one of Zoey's college roommates at Blair. She is goth, openly bisexual, and is studying to be a school teacher. 
Krista: Krista is a bubbly young woman and one of Zoey's college roommates. She is part of a local sorority. In later issues she invites Zoey and Ash to a party thrown by her sorority, where her sorority sister Mandy pressures her to entertain a boy that Mandy is interested in, which results in Krista being forced to perform oral sex on him. 
Mandy: Mandy is Krista's sorority sister and is shown to be snobby and mean-spirited, as she was openly rude to Ash and Zoey during the party and also told Krista to entertain a boy Mandy is interested in, saying to keep him there by any means necessary. She is killed by Zoey due to her actions and personality in issue #6.
Brock: Brock is a student athlete at Blair and Mandy's boyfriend. He tries to rape Zoey at a party but is stopped by the intervention of a fellow party goer in a hockey mask. Zoey later kills him along with Mandy.
Unnamed serial killer: The serial killer's identity and gender is currently not revealed in the series, but is implied to be the male party goer that stopped Brock's attempted rape of Zoey. In issue #6 he formally interacts with Zoey for the first time by sending her a Polaroid of Mandy's body with the message that s/he admired her work.

Production
While first developing the idea for A Voice in the Dark (then titled Dark Zoey), Taylor intended for artist Duncan Eagleson to illustrate the series. This changed after Taylor realized that they would be unable to afford the price Eagleston charged per page and chose to draw the series himself. As they have arthrogryposis, Taylor is unable to draw the comic in conventional means and illustrates the series by way of a Wacom Cintiq tablet and a brush that they hold in their mouth. They arrange scenes and poses by taking reference pictures of several of their friends in various poses and scenarios, which they use to help with illustrations. Their wife Sylv, an artist and legally blind, works as a colorist for the series' issue covers. Taylor raised funds for the series via several successful Kickstarter campaigns.

A Voice in the Dark was originally planned as a spoof of the horror genre along the lines of the 1988 film Heathers and the character of Zoey was intended to be the series final girl, as the common trope for horror is that "the ethnic character always dies first". After some consideration, Taylor began developing Zoey as a female killer as they thought "what if she survives because she's the killer?". They also chose for Zoey to have a typical, non-abusive childhood and also decided against making her into a psychopath or sociopath, instead having Zoey feel emotions and have a conscience about her murders. Taylor has planned for the series to be ongoing and has written story arcs up to issue 13, with further issues to be made if there is enough reader demand.

Reception
Critical reception for A Voice in the Dark has been predominantly positive and a reviewer for the Salt Lake City Weekly wrote that "A comic book this well-written and capably drawn is an achievement for any creator, but the tenacity required to launch a comic book you drew with a pencil between your teeth is nothing short of amazing." Reviewers for Ain't It Cool News and Crave Online echoed similar sentiments, and Ain't It Cool News recommended the series highly. Comics Bulletin reviewed issue seven of the series and commented that I don't think people realize what an important book A Voice In The Dark has grown to become in the space of just seven issues. It plays with taboos, from relatively tame consensual bondage kink, to the mix of violence and sexuality, to the depiction of female leads in fiction, to heteronormative stereotypes about the female figure and beauty, to just what the hell is going on in the minds of our Gen Y Millennials these days.

References

External links
 
 Kickstarter
 Issue #1 of A Voice in the Dark at Bleeding Cool

2013 comics debuts
Top Cow titles
American comics titles